A Gothic–Industrial Tribute to Smashing Pumpkins is a 2001 tribute album, featuring a variety of artists covering songs from the American alternative rock band Smashing Pumpkins.

Track listing
 "Rhinoceros" – Günter Schulz & En Esch
 "Ava Adore" – Candymachine 88 with Tina Root of Switchblade Symphony
 "Bullet with Butterfly Wings" – Sigue Sigue Sputnik
 "The End Is the Beginning Is the End" – Dark Corridor
 "Disarm" – 16 Volt Vs. Spahn Ranch
 "Cherub Rock" – Razed In Black
 "God" – Electric Hellfire Club
 "1979" – PIG
 "Frail & Bedazzled" – Godbox
 "Today" – Shining (Julian Beeston ex Nitzer Ebb)
 "Eye" – Rosetta Stone
 "Soma" – Bella Morte
 "Zero" – Synical

References

2001 compilation albums
The Smashing Pumpkins tribute albums